Inkpen Crocus Fields is a  biological Site of Special Scientific Interest near Inkpen in Berkshire. It is managed by the Berkshire, Buckinghamshire and Oxfordshire Wildlife Trust.

Geography

The field is old pasture which has not been ploughed or ‘improved’ with fertilisers. Cattle are used to graze the site in the summer and autumn to ensure coarse grasses don’t out-compete the flower-rich sward and orchids.

The crocus field slopes down to a spring-fed stream, then rises to become fine meadowland. Along the edge of the pasture an old hedgerow offers food and refuge to a host of birds.

History

Inkpen parish records have shown the crocuses have been there for at least 200 years. There is a local legend that 12th-century Crusaders brought the crocuses back from Europe as a source of saffron to flavour food.

In 1986 the site was designated a site of special scientific interest (SSSI). The site was created as a SSSI not for its crocuses, as they are non-native, but for its species-rich meadowland.

Fauna

The site has the following fauna:

Birds

Dunnock
Song thrush
Eurasian blackcap
Common chiffchaff
Lesser whitethroat
Willow warbler
Northern lapwing

Mammals

Dexter cattle

Invertebrates
Bombus terrestris

Flora

The site has the following Flora:

References

Sites of Special Scientific Interest in Berkshire
Berkshire, Buckinghamshire and Oxfordshire Wildlife Trust